Grace Road, known for sponsorship reasons as the Uptonsteel County Ground, Grace Road, is a cricket ground in Leicester, England. It is the home ground and administrative base of Leicestershire County Cricket Club.

History

Leicestershire County Cricket Club bought in 1877 the land on which Grace Road now stands from the then Duke of Rutland, and spent the massive sum of £40,000 on developing a cricket club, athletic track and hotel. The first match played there took place three months later, when Leicestershire played a touring Australia team. Contrary to popular belief, the road was named after Grace Margaret Yearby, the daughter of a local property owner Edward John Yearby, not W. G. Grace.

Leicestershire CCC left the Grace Road site in 1901, owing to low attendances at matches, which were blamed on lack of public transport to the ground. The club moved to a site near to Aylestone Road in order to be closer to the city centre. Leicestershire eventually returned to Grace Road in 1946, after the end of the Second World War, and has been based there ever since, re-purchasing the land in 1966.

The record attendance, at Leicestershire's match against the touring 1948 Australians, is 16,000.

International cricket
Three One Day Internationals have been played at Grace Road, although none has involved England.

In the 1983 Cricket World Cup eventual winners India, chasing a target of 156, beat Zimbabwe by five wickets. The second and third games were both in the 1999 World Cup. In the second Zimbabwe beat India by three runs, and in the third the West Indies beat Scotland by eight wickets.

International centuries

Women's Test centuries
One WTest century has been scored at the venue.

Women's One-Day International centuries
Five WODI centuries have been scored at the venue.

Dimensions
In front of the wicket at both ends the pitch is measured at 56 metres, while square of the wicket on both sides the dimensions are recorded as 76 metres. This is larger than most county grounds, but smaller than some of England's major international venues such as the Oval.

See also
List of cricket grounds in England and Wales
List of Leicestershire County Cricket Club grounds

References

Cricket grounds in Leicestershire
Sports venues in Leicester
Leicestershire County Cricket Club
Sports venues completed in 1878
1999 Cricket World Cup stadiums
1983 Cricket World Cup stadiums